Osa Conservation Area is an administrative area which is managed by SINAC for the purposes of conservation in Costa Rica, on the southern Pacific coast region. It contains two National Parks, and numerous Wildlife refuges and other types of nature reserve.

Protected areas
 Ballena Marine National Park
 Caño Island Biological Reserve
 Carate Mixed Wildlife Refuge
 Corcovado National Park
 Golfito Mixed Wildlife Refuge
 Golfo Dulce Forest Reserve
 Osa Mixed Wildlife Refuge
 Pejeperro Wildlife Refuge
 Piedras Blancas National Park
 Preciosa-Platanares Mixed Wildlife Refuge
 Punta Río Claro Mixed Wildlife Refuge
 Quillotro Mixed Wildlife Refuge
 Rancho La Merced Mixed Wildlife Refuge
 Térraba-Sierpe Wetland

References

Conservation Areas of Costa Rica